In the Affirmative is a 1962 French film by Claude Lelouch. Though Lelouch had experienced failure with his debut feature Le Propre de l'homme, he managed to gain favourable exposure when the film was sent to be exhibited in Sweden and earned compliments from Swedish film director Ingmar Bergman. It was entered into the 14th Berlin International Film Festival.

Plot
The film is a road movie that follows a middle aged man who gives a young woman a lift. On the car radio, news bulletins warn the population against a recently escaped sadist who is known to prey on young women and children. Lelouch often cuts away from the main story, if only briefly, to parallel events that are not necessarily crucial to the story but illustrate what is suggested by the radio.

Cast
 Guy Mairesse - Robert Blam
 Janine Magnan - L'auto-stoppeuse (hitchhiker)
 Jean Franval - Un policier (policeman) (as Franval)
 Richard Saint-Bris - Le commissaire (superintendent) (as Saint-Bris)
 France-Noëlle - La patronne de l'hôtel (hotelier)
 Jacques Martin - Le journaliste (journalist)
 Jean Daurand - Le patron du relais routier (truck-stop owner) (as Daurand)
 Bernard Papineau - (as Papineau)
 Mosin
 Joëlle Picaud - La victime du bois (victim in the woods)
 Lyonnais
 Jacqueline Morane - (as Morane)
 Rita Maiden - La servante du restaurant (restaurant waitress)

References

External links
 

1962 films
1960s French-language films
Films directed by Claude Lelouch
1962 drama films
French black-and-white films
1960s French films